Christopher E. Collins (born March 22, 1971) is a former member of the Virginia House of Delegates. He was first elected in 2015, and represented the 29th district comprising the City of Winchester and parts of Frederick County and Warren County.

On June 28, 2020, Collins resigned in order to accept an appointment as a judge to Virginia's 26th Judicial District.

References

1971 births
Living people
Politicians from Lynchburg, Virginia
Republican Party members of the Virginia House of Delegates
21st-century American politicians